Apaidia is a genus of moths in the subfamily Arctiinae. The genus was erected by George Hampson in 1900.

Species
 Apaidia barbarica Legrand, 1939
 Apaidia mesogona (Godart, 1822)
 Apaidia rufeola (Rambur, 1832)

References

Lithosiina
Moth genera